Hopea altocollina is a tree in the family Dipterocarpaceae, native to Borneo. The specific epithet altocollina means "high hills", referring to the species' habitat.

Description
The bark is fissured and flaky.

Distribution and habitat
Hopea altocollina is endemic to Borneo.

Conservation
Hopea altocollina has been assessed as endangered on the IUCN Red List. It is threatened by logging for its timber. The species is found in some protected areas.

References

altocollina
Endemic flora of Borneo
Plants described in 1967
Taxonomy articles created by Polbot